Jens Dyrløv Eriksen (born 30 December 1969) is a badminton player from Denmark. He competed in four consecutive Olympic Games from 1996 to 2008, and won a mixed doubles bronze medal in 2004 partnered with Mette Schjoldager. At the World Championships, Eriksen won two silvers in 1995 and 1997, and also two bronze medals in 2001 and 2006.

Career

2004 Olympics
He played badminton at the 2004 Summer Olympics in men's doubles and mixed doubles.

In men's doubles, Eriksen and his partner Martin Lundgaard Hansen had a bye in the first round and defeated Howard Bach and Kevin Han of the United States in the second. In the quarterfinals, Eriksen and Hansen beat Fu Haifeng and Cai Yun of China 3-15, 15-11, 15-8. They lost the semifinal to Lee Dong-soo and Yoo Yong-sung of Korea 9-15, 15-5, 15-3 and the bronze medal match against Eng Hian and Flandy Limpele of Indonesia 15-13, 15-7 to finish fourth place.

He also competed in mixed doubles with partner Mette Schjoldager. They defeated Svetoslav Stoyanov and Victoria Wright of France in the first round and Kim Yong-hyun and Lee Hyo-jung of Korea in the second. In the quarterfinals, Eriksen and Schjoldager beat Nova Widianto and Vita Marissa of Indonesia 15-12, 15-8 to advance to the semifinals. There, they lost to Zhang Jun and Gao Ling of China 15-9, 15-5. In the bronze medal match, they defeated fellow Danish pair Jonas Rasmussen and Rikke Olsen 15-5, 15-5 to win the bronze medal.

He missed the chance to be the first Danish sportsman in 20 years (since Henning Lynge Jakobsen at the 1984 Summer Olympics) to win two medals in the same Olympic Games.

Achievements

Olympic Games 
Mixed doubles

World Championships 
Men's doubles

Mixed doubles

World Cup 
Men's doubles

Mixed doubles

European Championships 
Men's doubles

Mixed doubles

BWF Superseries 
The BWF Superseries, which was launched on 14 December 2006 and implemented in 2007, was a series of elite badminton tournaments, sanctioned by the Badminton World Federation (BWF). BWF Superseries levels were Superseries and Superseries Premier. A season of Superseries consisted of twelve tournaments around the world that had been introduced since 2011. Successful players were invited to the Superseries Finals, which were held at the end of each year.

Men's doubles

IBF World Grand Prix 
The World Badminton Grand Prix was sanctioned by the International Badminton Federation from 1983 to 2006.

Men's doubles

Mixed doubles

IBF International 
Mixed doubles

References

External links 
 Jens Eriksen at InternationalBadminton.org
 
 
 Jens Eriksen at Badminton.dk
 
 

1969 births
Living people
People from Glostrup Municipality
Danish male badminton players
Badminton players at the 1996 Summer Olympics
Badminton players at the 2000 Summer Olympics
Badminton players at the 2004 Summer Olympics
Badminton players at the 2008 Summer Olympics
Olympic badminton players of Denmark
Olympic bronze medalists for Denmark
Olympic medalists in badminton
Medalists at the 2004 Summer Olympics
World No. 1 badminton players
Sportspeople from the Capital Region of Denmark